Harold White (16 June 1876 – 11 January 1965) was an English first-class cricketer and clergyman.

White was born at Kirkstall in June 1876. He later studied at Keble College at the University of Oxford. While studying at Oxford he made his debut in first-class cricket for Oxford University against A. J. Webbe's XI at Oxford in 1900. He played first-class cricket for Oxford University until 1901, making eleven appearances. Playing as a right-arm fast bowler, White took 31 wickets at an average of 23.38, with best figures of 6 for 10. These figures were his only first-class five wicket haul and came against Sussex at Hove in 1900. His teammates while playing for Oxford included Bernard Bosanquet, and, Tip Foster, a future England captain.

After graduating from Oxford he became an anglican clergyman. While working as a clergyman at Cramlington, White played minor counties cricket for Northumberland between 1909–1913, making eight appearances in the Minor Counties Championship. His career as a clergyman later took him to Killingworth, Bugbrooke, and Chawton. He died at Taunton in January 1965.

References

External links

1876 births
1965 deaths
cricketers from Leeds
Alumni of Keble College, Oxford
English cricketers
Oxford University cricketers
Northumberland cricketers
20th-century English Anglican priests